Rainbow Falls (informally known as Graffiti Falls) is a waterfall located on Fountain Creek in Manitou Springs, Colorado.  The falls' plunge is located beneath a bridge that links Manitou Avenue to Highway 24.

The falls were closed in 2013 for improvement from the El Paso County Parks Department, but have since reopened with a concrete walkway that snakes along the river.

Images

References

See also

Waterfalls of Colorado

Waterfalls of Colorado
Landforms of El Paso County, Colorado
Plunge waterfalls